The Honor of the District Attorney is a 1915 American silent short film directed by Reaves Eason.

Cast
 Vivian Rich as Dora Mortimer
 Louise Lester as Nora Mortimer - Dora's Mother
 Josephine Ditt as Mrs. Dean Mortimer 
 William Spencer as Philip Storey
 Harry Van Meter as John Mortimer - Dora's Father
 Jack Richardson as Ben Morgan

See also
 List of American films of 1915

External links

1915 films
American silent short films
American black-and-white films
Films directed by B. Reeves Eason
1910s American films